Psychropotes is a genus of sea cucumbers in the family Psychropotidae. The members of this genus possess the ability to swim, although this is only facultative.

Description
As adults, species of Psychropotes are roughly cylindrical in shape and red to violet in colour. They have a sail-like appendage which can be used for swimming during the larval stage, but is no longer needed when it is fully grown. Larvae of Psychropotes species are benthopelagic and swim around using the aforementioned appendage, however researchers are still trying to understand its use when the holothurian is fully grown. Larvae are transparent and can grow to around 2 cm long.

Species
The following species are recognised in the genus Psychropotes:

 Psychropotes belyaevi Hansen, 1975
 Psychropotes depressa (Théel, 1882)
 Psychropotes dubiosa Ludwig, 1893
 Psychropotes dyscrita (Clark, 1920)
 Psychropotes fuscopurpurea Théel, 1882
 Psychropotes hyalinus Pawson, 1985
 Psychropotes longicauda Théel, 1882
 Psychropotes loveni Théel, 1882
 Psychropotes minuta (Koehler & Vaney, 1905)
 Psychropotes mirabilis Hansen, 1975
 Psychropotes monstrosa Théel, 1882
 Psychropotes moskalevi Gebruk & Kremenetskaia in Gebruk et al., 2020
 Psychropotes pawsoni  Gebruk & Kremenetskaia in Gebruk et al., 2020
 Psychropotes raripes Ludwig, 1893
 Psychropotes scotiae (Vaney, 1908)
 Psychropotes semperiana Théel, 1882
 Psychropotes verrucicaudatus Xiao, Gong, Kou & Li, 2019
 Psychropotes verrucosa (Ludwig, 1894)
 Psychropotes xenochromata Rogacheva & Billett, 2009

References

Holothuroidea genera
Psychropotidae
Taxa named by Johan Hjalmar Théel